This bibliography of Chip Berlet contains a list of articles, books, book chapters, book reviews, presentations and reports by activist and author Chip Berlet as well as articles about him and his works.

Articles
"Student newspaper faces libel suit, Administration disavows responsibility." Daily Nexus (University of California, Santa Barbara), vol. 51, no. 99 (Apr. 8, 1971), p. 10. Full issue.
"Scientologists Kept Spy Link: Interpol Among Targets Along With FBI, DEA." Daily Nexus (University of California, Santa Barbara), vol. 58, no. 9 (Sep. 26, 1977), p. 12. Full issue.
"Lyndon LaRouche and the U.S. Labor Party: Cult Fanaticism and the Politics of Paranoia." Chicago Reader (Mar. 7, 1980).
"Ever Hear of Lyndon LaRouche? He May be Keeping Tabs on You." Des Moines Register (Sep. 23, 1981).
"They Want to Take Your Drugs Away!" High Times (May 1981).
"Private Spies: A New Threat To Constitutional Rights." Public Eye, vol. 3, no. 3-4 (1982).
 "LaRouche Cult Continues to Grow: Researchers Call for Probe of Potentially Illegal Acts," with Russ Bellant & Dennis King. Public Eye, vol. 3, no. 3-4 (1982).
 "LaRouche Loses Libel Suit," with Russ Bellant. The Guardian [New York] (Nov. 14, 1984).
 "Turning the Tables on Lyndon LaRouche," with Reena Bernards. Progressive Review (May 1986), pp. 34-35.
 "Fascism Wrapped in the American Flag." Political Research Associates (Mar. 10, 1989).
 "The N.E.D.'s Ex-Nazi Adviser: Harbinger of Democracy?" with Holly Sklar. The Nation (Apr. 2, 1990), pp. 450-457.
 "Attacks On Greenpeace and Other Ecology Groups." Political Research Associates (Aug. 22, 1991).
"NED, CIA, and the Orwellian Democracy Project," with Holly Sklar. CovertAction Information Bulletin, no. 39 (Winter 1991), pp. 10-13. Full issue.
"Fascism!" Political Research Associates (Sep. 28, 1992).
"Theocracy and White Supremacy: Behind the Culture War to Restore Traditional Values." Co-authored by Margaret Quigley. The Public Eye (Dec. 1, 1992). Full issue.
"Friendly Fascists: The Far Right Moves in on the Left." The Progressive (Jun. 1992), pp. 16–20.
 "The A.D.L. Under Fire: Its Shift to Right Has Led to Scandal"(Op-Ed), with Dennis King. New York Times (May 28, 1993), p. A29. Archived from the original.
"Big Stories, Spooky Sources." Columbia Journalism Review, vol. 32, no. 1 (May/Jun. 1993), pp. 67+.
"Right Woos Left." Political Research Associates (Feb. 22, 1994).
 "Festive CNP Conclave in St. Louis: Where the Right-Wing Elite CNP Meet." CovertAction Information Bulletin, no. 48 (Spring 1994), pp. 50-63.
 "The Hunt for Red Menace: How Government Intelligence Agencies & Private Right-Wing Groups Target Dissidents & Leftists as Subversive Terrorists & Outlaws." Political Research Associates (1994).
 "The Violence of Right-Wing Populism." Peace Review, vol. 7, no. 3-4 (1995), pp. 283–288.
 "John Salvi, Abortion Clinic Violence, and Catholic Right Conspiracism." Political Research Associates (Mar. 19, 1996).
 "Fascism's Franchises: Stating the Differences from Movement to Totalitarian Government." Toronto: American Sociological Association (1997).
 "One Key to Litigating Against Government Prosecution of Dissidents: Understanding the Underlying Assumptions," with Matthew N. Lyons. Police Misconduct and Civil Rights Law Report, vol. 5, no. 13-14, West Group.
"The Patriot and Armed Militia Movements," with Matthew N. Lyons. Political Research Associates (Apr. 16, 1998).
"Abstaining from Bad Sects: Understanding Sects, Cadres, and Mass Movement Organizations." (1999).
 "Right Woos Left." Political Research Associates (Feb. 27, 1999).
 "Clinton, Conspiracism, and the Continuing Culture War: What is Past is Prologue." Public Eye (Apr. 1, 1999). Full issue.
 "Challenging the Right." Political Research Associates (Nov. 14, 1999).
 "The Maldon Institute." Political Research Associates (Sep. 8, 2000).
 "Dynamics of Bigotry," with Matthew N. Lyons. Political Research Associates (Nov. 11, 2000).
 "Encountering and Countering Political Repression." Political Research Associates (Nov. 15, 2001).
 "Anti-Masonic Conspiracy Theories: A Narrative Form of Demonization and Scapegoating." Heredom, vol. 10 (2002), pp. 243–275.
 "The LaRouche Network: A History of Intimidation." (Nov. 2, 2003).
 "Militias in the Frame." Contemporary Sociology, vol. 33, no. 5 (2004) pp. 514-521. .
 "ZOG Ate My Brains: Conspiracy Theories about Jews Abound. Chip Berlet Unpacks their Appeal." New Internationalist, no. 372 (Oct. 2004) pp. 20-21.
 "Calvinism, Capitalism, Conversion, and Incarceration." Public Eye (Nov. 5, 2004). Full issue.
 "Christian Identity: The Apocalyptic Style, Political Religion, Palingenesis and Neo-Fascism." Totalitarian Movements and Political Religions, vol. 5, no. 3 (Winter 2004), pp. 469–506. .
 "The Sucker Punch of Right/Left Coalitions." Political Research Associates (2005).
 "Right-Wing Populism." Political Research Associates (2005).
 "Mussolini on the Corporate State." Political Research Associates (Jan. 12, 2005).
 "Romney’s Spy Center." Boston Globe (Jun. 14, 2005), p. A19.
 "Whither the Christian Right?: How Religious Conservatives Succeeded and Failed in the 2006 Elections." Political Research Associates (Dec. 1, 2006)
 "The North American Union Right-Wing Populist Conspiracism Rebounds." Political Research Associates (Mar. 5, 2008).
 "The Christian Right's Staying Power," with Katherine H. Ragsdale. The Progressive, vol. 72, no. 7 (Jul. 2008), pp. 26-28.
 "Leaderless Counterterrorism Strategy: The 'War on Terror,' Civil Liberties, and Flawed Scholarship." Public Eye (Sep. 10, 2008). Full issue.
 "The Write Stuff: U.S. Serial Print culture from Conservatives out to Neo-Nazis." Library Trends, vol. 56, no. 3 (Winter 2008), pp. 570-600. .
 "On a Mission from God," with Esther Kaplan. In These Times (Nov. 2008), pp. 28-31.
 "Anti-Union Campaigns and The Big Three Bullies." Political Research Associates (Mar. 5, 2009).
 "Card Check, FDR, and Right-Wing History." Political Research Associates (Apr. 5, 2009).
 "Von Mises Rises from the Scrap Heap of History." Political Research Associates (May 5, 2009).
 "White Supremacist Shootings Post-Election Create Deadly Legacy." Political Research Associates (Jun. 17, 2009).
 "Violence and Public Policy: The Right Lessons." Criminology & Public Policy, vol. 8, no. 3 (Sep. 25, 2009), pp. 623-631. .
 "To Combat Teabaggerism, Reject the 'Producerist' Frame!" Progressive America Rising (Jan. 20, 2010). Archived from the original.
 Also published as "Tea Bags, Taxes, & Productive Citizens." Z Magazine (Feb. 2010).
 "Taking Tea Partiers Seriously." The Progressive, vol. 74, no. 2 (Feb. 2010).
 "Taking Tea Parties Seriously: Corporate Globalization, Populism, and Resentment: PGDT." Perspectives on Global Development and Technology, vol. 10, no. 1 (2011), p. 11. .
 "The Attack on Working People & Organized Labor." Political Research Associates (Apr. 19, 2011).
 "The Norway Attacks: 'Marketing' the Christian Right Culture Wars." Political Research Associates (Jul. 23, 2011).
 "Collectivists, Communists, Labor Bosses, and Treason: The Tea Parties as Right-Wing Populist Counter-Subversion Panic." Critical Sociology, vol. 38, no. 4 (2012), pp. 565+.
 "Drifting Right and Going Wrong: An Overview of the U.S. Political Right," with Jean Hardisty. Political Research Associates (Jun. 8, 2013).
 "The FBI's Dirty War." The Progressive, vol. 78, no. 3 (Mar. 2014), pp. 27-29.
 "Not Fascism: Trump is a Right-Wing Nativist Populist." Political Research Associates (Oct. 13, 2015).
 "'Trumping' Democracy: Right-Wing Populism, Fascism, and the Case for Action." Public Eye (Dec. 12, 2015). Full issue.
 "Social Movements Need an Infrastructure to Survive." Political Research Associates (Nov. 14, 2016).
 "What is the Third Position?" Political Research Associates (Dec. 19, 2016).
 "Populism as Core Element of Fascism," with Matthew N. Lyons. Political Research Associates (Dec. 21, 2016).
 "Rural Rage: The Roots of Right-Wing Populism in the United States," with Spencer Sunshine. Journal of Peasant Studies, vol. 43, no. 3 (2019), pp. 480-515. 

Books
Authored
 Right-Wing Populism in America: Too Close for Comfort. Co-authored by Matthew N. Lyons. Edited by Douglas Kellner. New York: Guilford Press, 2000. . . . 498 pp.Reed, Adolph (Jr). "Review of Right Wing Populism in America, by Chip Berlet." Guilford Press. guilford.com.
"Chip Berlet has been a valuable resource for many years to everyone concerned about the potentially dangerous right-wing ideological strains that operate in this country. His work with Political Research Associates has been a most important source of data and analysis. Now he and Matthew Lyons have made yet another major contribution. Right Wing Populism in America builds on their years of expertise to provide a sweeping historical account of the tradition of such tendencies in American politics....This is an important analysis for everyone—scholars and nonspecialists alike—who wishes to understand the complex, sometimes ugly forces that have participated in shaping the American political landscape."Trumping Democracy: From Reagan to the Alt-Right. Routledge, 2019. .

Edited
 Eyes Right! Challenging the Right Wing Backlash. Boston, Massachusetts: South End Press, 1995. . . . 398 pp.

Book chapters
 "Theocracy & White Supremacy." Co-authored by Margaret Quigley. Eyes Right! Challenging the Right Wing Backlash. Boston: South End Press, 1995.
 "Uniting to Defend the Four Freedoms." Eyes Right! Challenging the Right Wing Backlash. Boston: South End Press, 1995.
 "Three Models for Analyzing Conspiracist Mass Movements of the Right." Conspiracies: Real Grievances, Paranoia, and Mass Movements, edited by Eric Ward. Seattle: Northwest Coalition Against Malicious Harassment & Peanut Butter Publishing, 1996.
 "An Introduction to Propaganda Analysis." Uncovering the Right on Campus: A Guide to Resisting Conservative Attacks on Equality and Social Justice. Cambridge: Center for Campus Organizing, 1997.
 "Following the Threads: A Work in Progress." Unraveling the Right: The New Conservatism in American Thought and Politics, edited by Amy Elizabeth Ansell. Boulder, Colorado: Westview Press, 1998.
 "Who's Mediating the Storm? Right-Wing Alternative Information Networks." Culture, Media, and the Religious Right, edited by Linda Kintz & Julia Lesage. Minneapolis: University of Minnesota Press, 1998.
 "Hate Groups, Racial Tension and Ethnoviolence in an Integrating Chicago Neighborhood 1976-1988." Research in Political Sociology, Volume 9: The Politics of Social Inequality, edited by Betty A. Dobratz, Lisa K. Walder & Timothy Buzzell. 2001, pp. 117-163.
 "Encountering and Countering Political Repression." The Global Activists Manual: Local Ways to Change the World, edited by Mike Prokosch, Laura Raymond & Michael Prokosch. New York: Thunder Mouth Press/Nation Books, 2002.
 "Mapping the Political Right: Gender and Race Oppression in Right-Wing Movements." Home-Grown Hate: Gender and Organized Racism, edited by Abby Ferber. New York: Routledge, 2004.
 "Protocols to the Left Protocols to the  Right: Conspiracism in American Political Discourse at the Turn of the Second Millennium", in 
 "Hayek, Mises, and the Iron Rule of Unintended Consequences" (Chapter 3). Hayek: A Collaborative Biography, Part IX: The Divine Right of the 'Free' Market, edited by Dr. Robert Leeson. Springer International Publishing, 2017.  / . .

Book reviews
 Review of Inventing Reality: The Politics of Mass Media by Michael Parenti. The Library Quarterly, Vol. 57, No. 2, April 1987.
 Review of The False Prophet: Rabbi Meir Kahane FBI Informant to Knesset Member. Z Magazine, 1990.
 Review of Inside Organized Racism: Women in the Hate Movement by Kathleen M. Blee. American Anthropologist, Vol. 106, No. 1, 2004, pp. 180-181.

Interviews with Chip Berlet
"Tiller Killing Spurs Renewed Calls for US to Reverse Longstanding Passivity on Anti-Abortion Extremists." Democracy Now!, with Amy Goodman (June 2, 2009) Transcript.
"Extremism, Conspiracy Theory and Murder." NPR Fresh Air with Terry Gross (June 18, 2009) Transcript.
"Interview with Chip Berlet." Lennox Seminar (October 5, 2016)

Interviews by Chip Berlet
 Interview with Michael Barkun. "Understanding the Relationship Between Antisemitism, Conspiracism, and Apocalypticism." Supplement for New Internationalist Magazine (September 2004)
 Interview with Brenda E. Brasher. "Understanding the Relationship Between Antisemitism, Conspiracism, and Apocalypticism." Supplement for New Internationalist Magazine (September 2004)
 Interview with G. William Domhoff. "Understanding the Relationship Between Antisemitism, Conspiracism, and Apocalypticism." Supplement for New Internationalist Magazine (September 2004)
 Interview with Mark Fenster. "Understanding the Relationship Between Antisemitism, Conspiracism, and Apocalypticism." Supplement for New Internationalist Magazine (September 2004)
 Interview with Robert Alan Goldberg. "Understanding the Relationship Between Antisemitism, Conspiracism, and Apocalypticism." Supplement for New Internationalist Magazine (September 2004)
 Interview with Lee Quinby. "Understanding the Relationship Between Antisemitism, Conspiracism, and Apocalypticism." Supplement for New Internationalist Magazine (September 2004)
 Interview with Penny Rosenwasser. "Understanding the Relationship Between Antisemitism, Conspiracism, and Apocalypticism." Supplement for New Internationalist Magazine (September 2004)
 Interview with Holly Sklar. "Understanding the Relationship Between Antisemitism, Conspiracism, and Apocalypticism." Supplement for New Internationalist Magazine (September 2004)
 Interview with Evan Harrington. "Conspiracy Theories and Conspiracism." Supplement for New Internationalist Magazine (November 2007). Archived from the original.
 Interview with Sonali Kolhatkar. "Conspiracy Theories and Conspiracism." Supplement for New Internationalist Magazine (November 2007). Archived from the original.

Presentations
 "Mad as Hell: Right-wing Populism, Fascism, and Apocalyptic Millennialism." (1998)
 Presented at the International Sociological Association 14th World Congress of Sociology in Montreal.
 "The Ideological Weaponry of the American Right: 'Dangerous Classes' and 'Welfare Queens.'" (1998)
 Presented at The "American Model": An Hegemonic Perspective for the End of the Millennium? at University of Lausanne, Switzerland.
 "Y2K and Millennial Pinball: How Y2K Shapes Survivalism in the U.S. Christian Right, Patriot and Armed Militia Movements, and Far Right." (1998)
 Presented at the annual symposium of the Center for Millennial Studies at Boston University.
 "Protocols to the Left, Protocols to the Right: Conspiracism in American Political Discourse at the Turn of the Second Millennium." (October 30-31, 2005)
 Prepared for a conference titled "Reconsidering 'The Protocols of the Elders of Zion': 100 Years After the Forgery" in ihe Elie Wiesel Center for Judaic Studies at Boston University. The presentation was dedicated to Jeremiah Duggan.

ReportsClouds Blur the Rainbow: The Other Side of New Alliance Party. Political Research Associates, June 1987. , . Full text available.Toxic to Democracy: Conspiracy Theories, Demonization & Scapegoating. Political Research Associates, June 2009. .
Up in Arms: A Guide to Oregon’s Patriot Movement. Spencer Sunshine with Rural Organizing Project and Political Research Associates, 2016. .

Works by other authors
Articles
 "Chip Berlet."Center for Millennial Studies, Boston University. Archived from the original.
Hayes, Ace R. "Berlet for Beginners."Portland Free Press, July/August 1995. Archived from the original.

 See also 
 Clouds Blur the Rainbow''

References

External links 
 Official website
 Works by Chip Berlet at HathiTrust
 Works by Chip Berlet at Internet Archive
 Works by Chip Berlet at Open Library
 Works by Chip Berlet at ResearchGate
 Works by Chip Berlet at WorldCat

Bibliographies by writer
Bibliographies of American writers
Journalism bibliographies